This is a list of the Archbishops of the Anglican Church of the Province of Central Africa, which encompasses the present-day Botswana, Malawi, Zambia, and Zimbabwe.

List of Archbishops of Central Africa

References

External links
Lambeth Conference
Anglicancommunion.org
Anglican Primates

Central Africa
 
Church of the Province of Central Africa